Grace Sari Ysidora (born 11 May 1993) is an Indonesian former tennis player.

She made her debut as a professional in 2008, aged 15, at an ITF tournament in Jakarta. In that year, she reached the final of the women's doubles of the inaugural 2008 Garuda Indonesia Tennis Masters, partnered by Septi Mende. They were defeated by Ayu-Fani Damayanti and Liza Andriyani.

She took part in the girls' competitions at the 2009 French Open, 2009 Wimbledon Championships, 2009 US Open, 2010 Australian Open, 2010 French Open, and 2010 Wimbledon Championships. Her greatest success was in reaching Round 3 at the Australian Open in the girls' singles competition.

Ysidora was Indonesia's sole representative in tennis at the 2010 Summer Youth Olympics.

She won her first ITF title in 2011. In that year, she also won two medals at the 2011 Southeast Asian Games in Palembang: bronze in the mixed doubles event, and silver in the team event.

ITF Circuit finals

Singles (0–1)

Doubles (2–3)

External links
 
 

Indonesian female tennis players
1993 births
Living people
Indonesian Christians
Sportspeople from Jakarta
Tennis players at the 2010 Summer Youth Olympics
Southeast Asian Games silver medalists for Indonesia
Southeast Asian Games bronze medalists for Indonesia
Southeast Asian Games medalists in tennis
Competitors at the 2011 Southeast Asian Games
21st-century Indonesian women